LCHC may refer to:
                                      
   Grand Theft Auto IV soundtrack#LCHC – Liberty City Hardcore
   Laboratory of Comparative Human Cognition (LCHC)